Ram Janmabhoomi Nyas (translation: Ram Birthplace Trust) is an organisation which was formed as a trust to promote and oversee the construction of a temple in Ayodhya, India at the Ram Janmabhoomi, the reputed site of the birth of Rama, the seventh and one of the most popular Avatars of Hindu God Vishnu. The Nyas was formed by members of the Vishva Hindu Parishad (World Hindu Council).

On 9 November 2019, the Supreme Court of India ruled to constitute a Trust to build a temple on the entire 2.77 acres of the land by Central Government not this Nyas. On 5 February 2020, the Central Government constituted the trust named Shri Ram Janmabhoomi Teerth Kshetra which is headed by Mahant Nritya Gopal Das.

Ayodhya dispute
Several Hindu religious and political organisations have sought to construct a temple on the site of Ram Janmabhoomi, to commemorate Rama. However, the Babri Mosque stood on the site of Ram Janmabhoomi, was constructed by Mughal emperor Babur after he demolished the original Rama temple on the site. The issue was taken up by organisations such as the Vishva Hindu Parishad (VHP), the Rashtriya Swayamsevak Sangh (RSS) and the Bharatiya Janata Party (BJP), a major Hindu nationalist political party. In 1992, a procession led by the VHP near the mosque ended up demolishing the mosque, which caused major communal violence across India between Hindus and Muslims.

Foundation
The Ram Janmabhoomi Nyas (RJN) was founded as an independent trust by members of the Vishva Hindu Parishad on 25 January 1993 to take charge of the site of Ram Janmabhoomi and oversee the construction of the proposed Rama temple. Ramchandra Das Paramhans (1913–2003) was head of the Ram Janmabhoomi Nyas, succeeded upon his death by Nritya Gopal Das. Its members argued that the Nyas was created so that the  Government of India would not control the site and end up involving itself in the construction of the temple. The RJN also operates workshops in Karsevakpuram (City of Volunteers), a major encampment of volunteer activists (called Karsevaks) outside Ayodhya preparing to undertake the construction of the temple.

2010 Allahanad High Court verdict on the Ayodhya dispute 
The leaders of the RJN welcomed the decision of the Allahabad High Court to distribute the disputed territory into three parts, with one-third going to the Muslim Sunni Waqf Board and another to the Nirmohi Akhara Hindu denomination. However, the RJN claimed that it was the rightful party to take possession of the land and said it would appeal to the Supreme Court of India to seek possession of the entire site.

2019 Supreme Court verdict on Ayodhya dispute
The final hearing in the Supreme Court ended on 16 October 2019. The bench reserved the final judgment and granted three days to contesting parties to file written notes on 'moulding of relief' or narrowing down the issues on which the court is required to adjudicate.

The final judgement in the Supreme Court was officially declared on 9 November 2019. The Supreme Court dismisses the claim of Sunni Waqf Board and ordered that a trust to be made by the Government of India which be building the Temple. On 5 February 2020, the government announced the creation of the trust to be known as Shri Ram Janmabhoomi Teerth Kshetra. On 5 August 2020, Ram Mandir Bhoomi-poojan was performed in the presence of RSS Chief, Prime Minister and Chief Minister of Uttar Pradesh.

References

Hindu organizations
Organizations established in 1993
Sangh Parivar
Ayodhya dispute